The 1984 Fiji rugby union tour of Australia was a series of matches played between March and April 1984 by Fiji national rugby union team in Australia.

No test match were played.

Results

Fiji
Fiji national rugby union team tours
tour
Rugby union tours of Australia
tour